"Second Thoughts on James Burnham" ("James Burnham and the Managerial Revolution", when published as a pamphlet) is an essay, first published in May 1946 in Polemic, by the English author George Orwell. The essay discusses works written by James Burnham, an American political theorist.

In the essay Orwell accepts that the general drift has 'almost certainly been towards oligarchy' and 'an increasing concentration of industrial and financial power' but criticises the tendency of Burnham's 'power-worship' and comments upon the failures in analysis that arise from it. Orwell biographer Michael Shelden; – "Orwell was always at his best when he was on the attack, and his Polemic essay on Burnham is a brilliant criticism of the whole concept of power worship."

Background

Burnham (1905–1987) was a former Trotskyist and professor of philosophy, who rejected dialectical materialism in favour of logical empiricism in 1940. In 1941 he published The Managerial Revolution. In the work, he offered theories about the new form of society which was emerging to replace capitalism, based upon his observations of capitalism's development in the interwar period. He saw much in common between the economic formations of Nazi Germany, Stalinist Russia, and America under Franklin D. Roosevelt and his "New Deal". He perceived that a new society had emerged in which a ruling class of "managers" had assumed all power and privilege. In a later book, The Machiavellians, he developed his theory, arguing that the emerging new elite will have to retain some democratic trappings—political opposition, a free press, and a controlled "circulation of the elites".

Orwell's article appeared as "Second Thoughts on James Burnham" in Polemic No 3 in May 1946 and in various essay collections, as "James Burnham and the Managerial Revolution" in a pamphlet printed by the Socialist Book Centre in Summer 1946 and as "James Burnham" in the summer 1947 issue of University Observer of Chicago.

Orwell discussed Burnham's work again in a further essay "Burnham's View of the Contemporary World Struggle" published in 1947.

Summary

Orwell summarises Burnham's ideas in The Managerial Revolution and The Machiavellians and highlights inconsistencies. He believed Burnham was fascinated by power and was sympathetic to Nazi Germany while they appeared to be winning, but by 1944 had transferred his sympathy to the USSR. He noted, however, that the theme of a new (and probably servile) society—neither capitalist nor socialist—was predicted in many works such as Belloc's The Servile State, and dystopian novels such as Wells' The Sleeper Awakes, Zamyatin's We and Huxley's Brave New World.

Orwell considers that Burnham differs from most other thinkers in trying to plot the course of future developments, and with the benefit of hindsight he identifies Burnham's completely erroneous prophecies in 1940 and 1941 which were
Germany is bound to win the war
Germany and Japan are bound to survive as great states and to remain the nuclei of power in their respective areas
Germany will not attack the USSR until after the defeat of Britain
The USSR is bound to be defeated

Orwell then quotes an essay by Burnham entitled "Lenin's Heir" which posits a continuity between Lenin and Stalin's policies and appears to pay homage to Stalin "a great man". Again Burnham makes false predictions. Orwell identifies the reason for such errors to be the expectation that events will follow the course on which they appear to be set. This, argues Orwell, is a consequence of the worship of power and to some extent of wishful thinking. Orwell also notes that Burnham adopts the general American position of accepting both Communism and Fascism while classifying them as much the same thing. Whereas Englishmen, if they believe they are the same thing, see them as monstrous evils and if not, they take sides.

Orwell concludes that Burnham may be right in identifying a general drift towards oligarchy with the concentration of industrial and financial power, and the development of the managerial/technical class. However his error is in seeing this trend as continuing, and he makes two erroneous assumptions:
Politics is essentially the same in all ages
Political behaviour is different from other kinds of behaviour.

Orwell refutes these assumptions and notes that just as Nazism had smashed itself to pieces, so the Russian regime will destroy itself. "The huge, invincible, everlasting slave empire of which Burnham appears to dream will not be established, or if established, will not endure."

Reactions
According to Christopher Hitchens, "Orwell was one of the very few commentators to see the sinister influence of [Burnham's] preachings, and subject these to a critique which greatly nettled Burnham himself."

Michael Shelden saw Burnham's work and Orwell's analysis as having an influence on his novel Nineteen Eighty-Four.

Robert Conquest saw the article as one of the first predictions that the Soviet Union would collapse if it could not successfully liberalise itself.

Extracts

But subjectively, a majority of Americans would prefer either Russia or Germany to Britain, and, as between Russia and Germany, would prefer whichever seemed stronger at the moment. It is, therefore, not surprising that Burnham's world view should often be noticeably close to that of the American imperialists on the one side, or to that of the isolationists on the other. It is a 'tough' or 'realistic' world-view which fits in with the American form of wish-thinking.

The immediate cause of the German defeat was the unheard-of folly of attacking the U.S.S.R., while Britain was still undefeated and America was manifestly getting ready to fight. Mistakes of this magnitude can only be made, or at any rate they are most likely to be made, in countries where public opinion has no power. So long as the common man can get a hearing, such elementary rules as not fighting all your enemies simultaneously are less likely to be violated.

See also
Bibliography of George Orwell

References

External links
 Online text

Essays by George Orwell
1946 essays
Works originally published in Polemic (magazine)